Nemoria rindgei is a species of emerald moth in the family Geometridae. It is found in North America.

The MONA or Hodges number for Nemoria rindgei is 7050.

References

Further reading

 

Geometrinae
Articles created by Qbugbot
Moths described in 1969